Thomas Dale Emberton Sr. (July 14, 1932 — October 20, 2022) was an American politician and judge in the state of Kentucky. He was the Republican nominee for his state's governorship in the 1971 election. Of note, Mitch McConnell worked on his campaign.

Emberton was born in Tompkinsville, Kentucky, in 1932. After attending Western Kentucky University, he earned a law degree from the University of Louisville School of Law  in 1962 and was admitted to the bar in that same year. He served as County Attorney for Metcalfe County from 1966 to 1967. Backed by term-limited Governor Louie B. Nunn and Senator John Sherman Cooper, Emberton lost to the Democratic Lieutenant Governor Wendell H. Ford, later a U.S. senator. Ford polled 470,720 votes (50.6 percent) to Emberton's 412,653 (44.3 percent). Former Democratic U.S. Senator and Governor Happy Chandler of Versailles received the remaining 39,493 votes (5.1 percent), running as an Independent.

Prior to his gubernatorial candidacy, Emberton served as a member of the Public Service Commission in the Nunn administration.

In 1980, Emberton ran in Kentucky's 5th congressional district but lost the primary to the eventual winner, Hal Rogers of Somerset in Pulaski County, who still holds the seat..

In 1987, Democratic Governor Wallace Wilkinson appointed Emberton to fill a vacancy on the Kentucky Court of Appeals. He held that position until his retirement in 2004. Emberton resided in Edmonton, the seat of Metcalfe County in southern Kentucky.

On October 20, 2022, Emberton's home in Edmonton caught fire; he later died when he re-entered the burning home in an effort to save it. He was 90 years old.

References 

1932 births
2022 deaths
Judges of the Kentucky Court of Appeals
Kentucky Republicans
People from Metcalfe County, Kentucky
Kentucky lawyers
University of Louisville School of Law alumni
Western Kentucky University alumni
Deaths from fire in the United States
Accidental deaths in Kentucky